The 71st season of the Campeonato Gaúcho kicked off on August 11, 1991 and ended in December 15, 1991. Twenty teams participated. Internacional beat holders Grêmio in the finals and won their 30th title. No teams were relegated.

Participating teams

System 
The championship would have three stages:

 First phase: The twenty teams were divided into two groups of ten, and played each other in a single round-robin system. The two best teams in each group and the four best teams with the best record qualified to the Second phase.
 Second phase: The eight remaining teams were divided into two groups of four, in which each team played the teams of its own group in a double round-robin system. The best teams in each group qualified to the Finals.
 Finals: The group winners played each other in three matches to define the champions.

Championship

First phase

Group 1

Group 2

Second phase

Group 1

Group 2

Finals 

|}

References 

Campeonato Gaúcho seasons
Gaúcho